Robert Codman (December 30, 1859 - October 7, 1915) was bishop of the Episcopal Diocese of Maine, serving from 1900 to 1915.

Early years
Codman was born in Boston, Massachusetts in 1859 to Robert Codman Sr, a prominent Boston lawyer. Codman's father Robert Sr had Congregationalist ancestry, with his own father, John Codman, serving as a Congregationalist minister. Nonetheless, Robert Codman Sr converted to Anglicanism. By the time of his death he had become a senior warden in the Church of the Advent in Boston, which was also the parish church in which his son Robert Jr, the future bishop, grew up. Codman was educated in public schools and later graduated in Law from Harvard University in 1882.

Ordained ministry 

He practiced law for some years, but upon the death of his brother, the Reverend Archibald Codman, he thoughts turned to the ordained ministry. He studied in the General Theological Seminary in New York City after which he was ordained deacon in 1893. He was appointed curate of All Saints Church in Ashmont, Boston. In 1894 he was ordained priest by Bishop Charles Chapman Grafton. He became rector of St John's Church in Boston Highlands.

Episcopacy
Codman was elected to succeed Henry A. Neely as Bishop of Maine. He was consecrated bishop on February 24, 1900, in St Luke's Cathedral in Portland. As bishop he altered and expanded the cathedral by adding the Emmanuel chapel which includes the Madonna and Child of John La Farge. He also expanded he Bishop's residence. Codman served as bishop till his death in 1915.

References 

The Living Church Annual, 1916, pp. 65–66.

1859 births
1915 deaths
Harvard Law School alumni
19th-century American Episcopalians
Episcopal bishops of Maine